The individual freestyle test, grade IV, para-equestrian dressage event at the 2012 Summer Paralympics was contested on 4 September at Greenwich Park in London.

The competition was assessed by a ground jury composed of five judges placed at locations designated E, H, C, M, and B. Each judge rated the competitors' performances with percentage scores for technical difficulty and artistic merit. The ten scores from the jury were then averaged to determine a rider's total percentage score.

Ground jury

Results

References 

 

Individual championship test grade IV